UFC 169: Barão vs. Faber 2 was a mixed martial arts event held on February 1, 2014, at the Prudential Center in Newark, New Jersey.

The event was released on DVD on May 6, 2014. The DVD was distributed by the label Anchor Bay Entertainment.

Background
A Light Heavyweight Championship bout between the current champion Jon Jones and #1 contender Glover Teixeira was briefly linked as the event headliner. However, just days after the announcement, Dana White indicated that "the timing didn't work out" for the pairing and that fight would take place at a later event.

The event was expected to be headlined by the long awaited return of the Bantamweight Champion Dominick Cruz. However, on January 6, UFC President Dana White announced that Cruz had torn his groin in training and pulled from the fight. Cruz had also vacated his title, making Renan Barão the undisputed bantamweight champion.  Stepping up to replace Cruz was Urijah Faber, in a rematch of their interim title bout at UFC 149.

Co-featured on the card was UFC Featherweight Champion José Aldo, who defended his title against top contender Ricardo Lamas.

A heavyweight bout between Frank Mir and Alistair Overeem, scheduled to take place at UFC 167, was moved to this event.

Bobby Green was expected to face Abel Trujillo at this event. However, Green pulled out of the fight for undisclosed reasons and was replaced by former WEC lightweight champion Jamie Varner.

Chris Cariaso was expected to face Kyoji Horiguchi at the event.  However, Horiguchi pulled out of the bout citing injury. He was replaced by WEC veteran Danny Martinez.

Results

Bonus awards
The following fighters were awarded fight night bonuses:

 Fight of The Night: Jamie Varner vs. Abel Trujillo ($75,000 each)
 Knockout of The Night: Abel Trujillo ($50,000)
 Submission of the Night: None awarded as no matches ended by submission

Records set
This event, along with UFC Fight Night: Machida vs. Mousasi, UFC Fight Night: Silva vs. Bisping, UFC Fight Night: Werdum vs. Tybura, and UFC Fight Night: Shogun vs. Smith, is currently tied for the second most decisions in a UFC event at 10, previously beating UFC 161. UFC 263 currently holds the record for most decisions in a UFC event at 11.

This event broke the record for the longest fight time with 2:51:14, later broken by UFC Fight Night: Machida vs. Mousasi with 2:53:32.

See also
List of UFC events
2014 in UFC

References

Ultimate Fighting Championship events
Events in Newark, New Jersey
2014 in mixed martial arts
Mixed martial arts in New Jersey
Sports competitions in Newark, New Jersey
2014 in sports in New Jersey